Jaime Colomé Valencia (born June 30, 1979 in Havana) is a Cuban retired footballer.

Club career
Colomé played most of his career as a midfielder for Ciudad La Habana. He played the 2016/17 season at Parham in Antigua and Barbuda alongside compatriots Odelin Molina and Hensy Muñoz and brother Yoel Colomé.

International career
A national team stalwart for over 12 years, Colomé made his debut for Cuba in a November 2002 Gold Cup qualification match against the Cayman Islands. He was a squad member at the 2003, 2005 and 2007 Gold Cup Finals. He has earned a total of 82 caps, scoring 11 goals and represented his country in 13 FIFA World Cup qualifying matches.

His final international was a July 2013 CONCACAF Gold Cup match against Panama.

International goals
Scores and results list Cuba's goal tally first.

Personal life
His brother Yoel also played for the national team.

References

External links
 
 La Voz Hispana article

1979 births
Living people
Sportspeople from Havana
Association football midfielders
Cuban footballers
Cuba international footballers
FC Ciudad de La Habana players
Parham F.C. players
2003 CONCACAF Gold Cup players
2005 CONCACAF Gold Cup players
2007 CONCACAF Gold Cup players
2011 CONCACAF Gold Cup players
2013 CONCACAF Gold Cup players
Cuban expatriate footballers
Expatriate footballers in Antigua and Barbuda
Cuban expatriate sportspeople in Antigua and Barbuda
Antigua and Barbuda Premier Division players